Farhat Hassan Khan (born 10 January 1965) is a Pakistani retired field hockey player. He won a bronze medal at the 1992 Summer Olympics in Barcelona.

References

External links

1965 births
Living people
Pakistani male field hockey players
Olympic field hockey players of Pakistan
Field hockey players at the 1992 Summer Olympics
Olympic bronze medalists for Pakistan
Olympic medalists in field hockey
Medalists at the 1992 Summer Olympics
Field hockey players at the 1986 Asian Games
Field hockey players at the 1990 Asian Games
Asian Games medalists in field hockey
Asian Games gold medalists for Pakistan
Asian Games silver medalists for Pakistan
Medalists at the 1986 Asian Games
Medalists at the 1990 Asian Games
20th-century Pakistani people